St George the Martyr's Church, Truro is a Grade II listed parish church in the Church of England in Truro, Cornwall.

History

The church was designed by the Revd William Haslam. It was consecrated on 5 October 1855 by Henry Phillpotts, Bishop of Exeter

The church was preceded by a temporary church built of wood which was the work of Mr. White, an architect and parishioner; it was opened on 23 April 1848 with a church service well attended by local clergy and lay people.

Organ

The original organ was rebuilt in 1892 by Brewer and Co of Truro.

The current organ was originally in the Methodist Church in St Columb Major. A specification of the organ can be found on the National Pipe Organ Register.

References

Truro
Truro
Churches completed in 1855
Anglo-Catholic church buildings in Cornwall